Mona Neubaur (born 1 July 1977) is a German politician from Alliance 90/The Greens who has been serving as Deputy Minister-President of North Rhine-Westphalia and also as State Minister for Economics, Industry, Climate Protection and Energy in the second cabinet of Minister-President Hendrik Wüst since 29 June 2022. She previously the leader of her party in North Rhine-Westphalia.

Early life and career 
Born to a nurse, Neubaur grew up in Pöttmes. In 1997 she moved to Düsseldorf to study education, sociology and psychology. 

From 2007 to 2014, Neubaur worked for the Heinrich Böll Foundation in Düsseldorf.

Political career 
Neubau joined the Green Party in 1999. From 2007 to 2015, she served as chairwoman of the Green Party in Düsseldorf.

From 2014 to 2022, Neubaur served as co-chair of the Green Party in North Rhine-Westphalia, alongside Sven Lehmann (2014–2018) and Felix Banaszak (2018–2022).

Neubaur was nominated by her party as delegate to the Federal Convention for the purpose of electing the President of Germany in 2022.

Other activities

Corporate boards
 NRW.BANK, Ex-Officio member of the supervisory board (since 2022)

Non-profit organizations
 Heinrich Böll Foundation, Member of the General Assembly
 Fortuna Düsseldorf, Member

Political positions 
Ahead of the 2022 presidential election, Neubaur publicly endorsed incumbent Frank-Walter Steinmeier of the Social Democrats.

References 

Living people
1977 births
Landtag group leaders (North Rhine-Westphalia)
Alliance 90/The Greens politicians
Members of the Landtag of North Rhine-Westphalia
21st-century German politicians
21st-century German women politicians
German environmentalists